Bik or BIK may refer to:

 .bik, the file extension for the Bink Video file format
 Brendan McFarlane, Irish Republican activist, nicknamed Bik
 Frans Kaisiepo Airport, Biak, Indonesia
 Bik, Iran, a village in North Khorasan Province, Iran
 Bcl-2-interacting killer, a human gene
 Benefit in kind, the value of something for tax purposes
 Baig, a noble title
 Bikol languages of the central Philippines (ISO 639-2 and 639-3 codes)
 Elisabeth Bik, microbiologist and consultant on scientific integrity
 Birkbeck station, London, National Rail station code

See also
 
 
 Bike (disambiguation)
 Bic (disambiguation)